Sir Thomas Wentworth Russell (1879–1954), better known as Russell Pasha, was a police officer in the Egyptian service. He was the fourth child and third son of the Rev. Henry Charles Russell, the grandson of the sixth duke of Bedford, and his wife, Leila Louisa Millicent Willoughby, the daughter of the eighth Baron Middleton.

As the director of the Central Narcotics Intelligence Bureau (CNIB), Russell Pasha became an anti-drug campaigner when he realised that opium, heroin, cocaine and hashish were being smuggled into Egypt in great and increasing quantities.

Studies
He was educated at Cheam School, Haileybury College, and Trinity College, Cambridge between the years 1899 and 1902. In 1902, he was awarded a BA. His choice of career was settled when he was invited to visit Cairo by a distant cousin, then adviser to the Egyptian minister of the interior. He went back home to graduate, entering the Egyptian service in October 1902. An apprenticeship of ten years gave him a good understanding of the Egyptian society as well as the conditions and customs that drove the lives of the Egyptian fellahin.

Early days
After an apprenticeship with the Alexandria coastguards, he was appointed provincial sub-inspector in the Ministry of Interior, in January 1902. He served later as inspector, in every Egyptian province, acquiring great knowledge of local officials, while directing police activities of all kind. In 1911 he was appointed assistant commandant of police in Alexandria. He was transferred to Cairo as assistant commandant in 1913.

In 1911 he married Evelyn Dorothea Temple (d.1968), with whom he had one son, Sir John Wriothesley Russell (who was to become British ambassador to Spain in 1969) and one daughter, Camilla Georgiana, who married the writer Christopher Sykes.

Becoming commandant
In 1917 he was appointed commandant of the Cairo city police with rank of major-general and title of Pasha.
After 1922 he served under twenty-nine different Egyptian ministers of interior. However, his talents were gradually focused on fighting the spread of drugs and drug addiction in Egypt. In 1929 the Egyptian Central Narcotics Intelligence Bureau (CNIB) was formed, with him as the director. He remained in this position until 1946. There he gained an even more profound understanding of Egyptian society that routine police work could ever have provided. Regarding the formation of the Egyptian Central Narcotics Intelligence Bureau, Russell Pasha writes in his memoirs:

While his main focus was on drug related crimes, in his 44 years of police work he also dealt with a large collection of other crimes. They included: many common murders (happening an average of eight times a day in Egypt, mostly committed by fellahin in compensation of their business or personal feuds), as well as the clarification of some big political assassinations in Cairo.

War on drugs

In his memoirs, Russell Pasha describes hashish and opium as "black drugs", and cocaine, morphine and heroin as "white drugs". It's the latter, chemical ones that he determined as a "major danger to the country"  and expresses his decision to "for a time ignore the black drug traffic, if doing so would get us on to the white". 
 
Russell Pasha’s view on the drug and ideas of how to deal with the drug problem were undoubtedly inspired by Britain’s hashish policy in India. The cultivation of cannabis in India was monopolised and its cultivation and sale were taxed and licensed. The possibility of implementing this same policy in India was constantly considered by British officials in Egypt. Three prominent British diplomats in Egypt, in the years preceding the CNIB, had called for policies similar to the one in India to be implemented in Egypt. They were: Alfred Caillard Pasha, the British general director of customs in Egypt; and Evelyn Barring (Lord Cromer) and Lord Kitchener, both British Consul Generals. They saw that, like in India, hashish was so widely consumed that it would be difficult to completely eradicate its consumption and instead it should be regulated. A law based on that of India's to regulate, register, and licence the manufacturing, selling, and import of hashish was drafted, but never put into effect.

Formation of the Central Narcotics Intelligence Bureau (CNIB)

Russell Pasha states in his memoirs that his request to form the CNIB was approved after he provided evidence to the Prime Minister that almost half a million Egyptians, out of a population of fourteen million, were drug addicts.

 

He also declares a feeling of fortune about the "exceptionally efficient team of officers and constables from the Egyptian Police" that he was able to select. The objects of the Bureau, described in his memoirs, were the following:

Hashish
During the brief French occupation of Egypt in 1798–1801, Napoleon banned hashish preparation and consumption because of the spread of its use among the French military, with little success, however. Mahammed Ali Pasha’s Egyptian government (starting in 1803) was focused on modernising the state, especially in the area of health. This idea of modernising medicine could have influenced the hostile attitudes towards hashish as it was an unregulated consumption of drugs. Hashish was banned in Egypt between 1868 and 1884. Muhammad Ali Bey, an important medical doctor (who was going to be later  the head of the medical school and the editor of Egypt's first medical journal, Ya'sub al-Tibb), published a detailed report in 1868 that led to the ban on cultivation, use and importation of hashish. In 1874 hashish was imported under the payment of duty, but in November 1877 an imperial order from Istanbul stipulated that all hashish brought into Egypt was to be destroyed. On March 1879 the Egyptian government banned the cultivation, distribution and importation of the drug in Egypt.

This prohibition of hashish in Egypt can be seen as a response to an image that started to become popular among European travellers and local Egyptian westernised intellectuals: of the Egyptian lower classes as demented, lethargic, irrational and unproductive hashish smokers and of Egyptian streets carrying the sweet and debilitating smell of hashish smoke. Banning hashish was a step in the direction to becoming a civilised society and a way to discipline the lower classes into rationality. Historically, Egyptians had recourse to the drug as an alternative to wine. Wine, even though prohibited in Islam, was known as the substance for the rich as it was more expensive, while the less expensive hashish was known as a substance for the poor.

The trafficking of hashish into Egypt in the later part of the nineteenth century and early twentieth century came mostly from Greece. In response to British pressure, Greece increased their prohibition efforts and Syrian and Lebanese suppliers took over the trafficking of hashish, moving it to Egypt through Palestine.

Russell Pasha's view on Hashish

Russell Pasha considered hashish consumption as a relatively innocuous habit, in comparison to the "plague" of heroin and cocaine consumption, which became popular after the First World War. Baron Harry D'Erlanger, Russell's associate, similarly declared that hashish was no more than a 'pet failing of many members of the poorer classes'. According to D'Erlanger, Russell considered legalising the drug, turning it into a revenue-producing good, thus preserving national funds, which would be spent on home-grown products rather than importing from abroad. This consideration echoes those of Caillard, Cromer, and Kitchener, based on the Indian policy. Nahas writes that British officials, and particularly Russell, did not care enough about the drug because they saw hashish intoxication as "one expression of oriental languid and dreamy temperament". Even though several British officials supported the legalisation of the drug, they continued to enforce the ban and guarded Egyptian borders, ports and shores to get a hold on the small percentage of the hashish that eventually found its way to Egyptian consumers.

Heroin, "the drug that nearly killed Egypt"

Russell Pasha writes in his memoirs:

Writing about those early days he states:

But then, the situation started to become alarming:

Curing addicts

As described by Russell Pasha in his memoirs, one of the traits of the drug addiction in Egypt was the pitiful desire of many addicts to be cured:

Progress made by the year 1931

The international trafficking of hashish (Indian hemp) was made illegal to countries that had criminalised it at the League of Nations' 1925 Opium Convention, after a suggestion made by Egypt. The League of Nations made this 'humanitarian effort' thinking that with international collaboration they could help heal the world's physical and social ills. Russell Pasha's reports on drugs and hashish to the Home Office in London were passed around the League of Nations Advisory Committee in 1929. Realizing the importance of examining the facts in those reports, Russell Pasha appeared at the Committee in Geneva as the Egyptian representative.

In January 1931, in a Communication to the League of Nations Special Committee Meeting in Geneva, where Russell Pasha was representing "the Kingdom of Egypt", he writes:

According to his observations, the majority of the big traffickers in Egypt at that time were the "Greeks, Turks and Palestinian Jews". He states:

It was lucky for Russell Pasha because if these traffickers were not local subjects, they would have been subject to capitulations, meaning that they were tried in consular courts and were exempt from Egyptian law.
Regarding the imprisonment of the traffickers, he writes in his memoirs that even if the Egyptian prison code states that a prisoner sentenced for a crime can be released under good conduct after three-quarters of time served, the grace is always denied to these.

Personality

In an obituary written following Russell Pasha's death in 1954, it is said of him:

Books written by Russell Pasha
The Wild Ducks and "Various" of Egypt. (pre 1940)
Egyptian Service: 1902–1946 (John Murray, 1949)

Retirement and later years of life

Russell Pasha retired in 1946 and dedicated the rest of his life to salmon fishing. He died in London on 10 April 1954.

References

1879 births
1954 deaths
British expatriates in Egypt
Law enforcement in Egypt
History of drug control
Cannabis in Egypt
Cannabis prohibition
People educated at Cheam School
People educated at Haileybury and Imperial Service College
Alumni of Trinity College, Cambridge